Lawra-Nandom is one of the constituencies represented in the Parliament of Ghana. It elects one Member of Parliament (MP) by the first past the post system of election. Lawra-Nandom is located in the Lawra district  of the Upper West Region of Ghana.

Boundaries
The seat is located within the Lawra District of the Upper West Region of Ghana.

Members of Parliament

Elections

See also
List of Ghana Parliament constituencies
Lawra (Ghana parliament constituency)
Nandom (Ghana parliament constituency)

Parliamentary constituencies in the Upper West Region